Ruthenica is a genus of air-breathing land snail, a terrestrial pulmonate gastropod mollusk in the subfamily Clausiliinae of the family Clausiliidae, the door snails, all of which have a clausilium.

Species
Species in the genus Ruthenica include:
 Ruthenica filograna (Rossmässler, 1836)
 Ruthenica gallinae (E. A. Bielz, 1861)

References

 Lindholm, W. A. (1924). A revised systematic list of the genera of the Clausiliidae, recent and fossil, with their subdivisions, synonymy, and types. Proceedings of the Malacological Society of London. 16 (1): 53‑80. London
Bank, R. A. (2017). Classification of the Recent terrestrial Gastropoda of the World. Last update: July 16th, 2017

External links

Clausiliidae